"Type" is the first single from Living Colour's second album Time's Up released in 1990.

Music video
Type's music video is set in a run down junkyard styled setting outside of New York City where the band is playing.  Throughout the video, images reflect technology, corporate greed, fundamentalist Christianity via televangelism, politics, and poverty have become the norm.  It also reflects how regular people are trying so hard to get what they can't have, but the rich can easily obtain.

Charts

References

Living Colour songs
1990 singles
Songs written by Vernon Reid
Song recordings produced by Ed Stasium
1990 songs
Epic Records singles
Songs about the media